La Rioja is a province of Argentina located in the west of the country. The landscape of the province consist of a series of arid to semi-arid mountain ranges and agricultural valleys in between. It is in one of these valleys that the capital of the province, the city of la La Rioja, lies. Neighboring provinces are from the north clockwise Catamarca, Córdoba, San Luis and San Juan. The dinosaur Riojasaurus is named after the province.

History 

Petroglyphs created by early indigenous peoples at the Talampaya National Park are dated around 10,000 years BC. Succeeding cultures of indigenous peoples developed here. The Diaguita, Capayan and the Olongasta peoples inhabited the territory of present-day La Rioja Province at the time of encounter with the Spanish colonists in the 16th century.

Juan Ramírez de Velazco founded Todos Los Santos de la Nueva Rioja in 1591 under the government of Tucumán of the Viceroyalty of Peru. In 1630 the Calchaquí people revolted against the Spanish, but the governor Albornoz suppressed them.

In 1783, after the creation of the Viceroyalty of the Río de la Plata, the control of the province of 10,000 inhabitants passed to the Córdoba independency. The province acquired independence from Córdoba in 1820. Following attempts by  Bernardino Rivadavia, the first elected President of Argentina, to impose a centralist constitution, the caudillo Juan Facundo Quiroga emerged as a popular leader. He represented their preference for more autonomy, for which they continued to press following  Quiroga's 1835 assassination. After a period of internal instability in Argentina, the province finally joined the Argentine Confederation in 1853.

La Rioja attracted fewer immigrants from Europe than did other Argentine provinces from 1890 to the 1930s.

Some Syrian and Lebanese immigrants did settle in the province, among whom the most well-known is probably the Menem family. Coming from what had been the Ottoman Empire, Saul Menem and his wife were of Armenian and Alawi ancestry. He prospered as a traveling salesman and sent his eldest son, Carlos Menem, to Spain for college. After the younger Menem was elected governor of La Rioja Province in March 1973, he implemented a number of reforms advocated by activists for the poor, rural majority, particularly those recommended by Bishop Enrique Angelelli.

Removed and imprisoned following the military ouster of President Isabel Perón in March 1976, Menem was kept in illegal confinement until the end of 1980. He was reportedly tortured during this time. The dictatorship repressed people in the province and was responsible for the brutal murder in August 1976 of Bishop Angelelli.  After democracy was restored in 1983, Menem was overwhelmingly re-elected to office. He pursued conservative policies, leveraging La Rioja's dry, agreeable climate, its modest wage scale, and skilled work-force, to attract La Rioja's first significant light industries, particularly bottling and food-processing.

Having presided over a growing La Rioja economy even as the nation's languished during the 1980s, Menem secured the Peronist Justicialist Party nomination for president in May 1988; in an upset, he defeated the popular Governor Antonio Cafiero of Buenos Aires Province. Elected president of Argentina in 1988, Menem served until 1999. During those years, he steered billions in federal public works spending into La Rioja. Although the province remains less developed than the average in the nation, its economy today compares favorably with those of its neighbors.

Geography

Located in the Argentine Northwest area, its landscape is arid to semi-arid, and the dry climate receives annually 200 mm of precipitation, has short winters, and very hot summers.

From the Andes at the west, with peaks of up to 6,795 meters (Monte Pissis), the relief's height descends towards the sierras of the neighbouring dry Pampas zone. Most ranges in La Rioja are oriented north-south. The province's two largest cities, La Rioja and Chilecito are separated by Sierra de Velasco and west of Chilecito and Famatina rises the Sierra de Famatina with heights of up to 6,250 m.a.sl. (≈20500 feet).

The Talampaya National Park is a dry red-soil canyon of the dry Talampaya river, which contains many cliff walls and rock formations that make it an interesting tourist destination.

Economy
La Rioja's economy, estimated at US$1.822 billion in 2006, is the second-smallest among Argentina's provinces. Its per capita output of US$6,283, though about 30% below the national average, makes it the most well-developed in northern Argentina.

Its economy is, likewise, very well-diversified. Agriculture (long limited by La Rioja's dry, mountainous terrain) adds less than 5% to its output.  La Rioja's agriculture (as well as cities) lies on the banks of the few permanent rivers and oases that allow irrigation, with only 190 square kilometres of cultivated land. Vineyards, nuts and olive plantations are the most common, followed by cotton.

The province's main crop is the grape, and its associated wine production, especially around the Chilecito area, with a production of 8 million litres per year.

Cattle (250,000 heads) and goats (150,000 heads) are secondary activities, particularly for skin and leather. Clay represents the main mining activity, and uranium is also extracted near El Colorado.

Manufacturing in La Rioja has expanded considerably since Gov. Menem began attracting investment into the province, after 1983.  Limited mostly to light industry like bottling and food processing, it, nevertheless, adds about 20% to La Rioja's output.  Tourism is, likewise, an expanding activity. Besides the Talampaya National Park, tourists visiting La Rioja usually go also to the Chilecito town, Cerro de La Cruz, Termas de Santa Teresita hot springs and the village of Villa Sanagasta.

La Rioja's development plan is being designed by Proyectos Innovadores to encourage further economic growth in the province.

Recently, the province experienced a wave of immigration from Eastern Europe, East or South Asian and Middle Eastern countries.

Government 
The provincial government is divided into the usual three branches: the executive, headed by a popularly elected governor, who appoint the cabinet; the legislative; and the judiciary, headed by the Supreme Court.

The Constitution of La Rioja Province, Argentina forms the formal law of the province.

In Argentina, the most important law enforcement organization is the Argentine Federal Police but the additional work is carried out by the La Rioja Provincial Police.

Political division

The province is divided in 18 departments (Spanish departamentos). They are formally considered to be a single municipality, and usually contain one or more population centers (i.e. towns and cities).

 Arauco (Aimogasta)
 Capital (La Rioja)
 Castro Barros (Aminga)
 Chamical (Chamical)
 Chilecito (Chilecito)
 Coronel Felipe Varela (Villa Unión)
 Famatina (Famatina)
 General Ángel Vicente Peñaloza (Tama)
 General Belgrano (Olta)
 General Juan Facundo Quiroga (Malazán)
 General Lamadrid (Villa Castelli)
 General Ocampo (Milagro)
 General San Martín (Ulapes)
 Independencia (Patquía)
 Rosario Vera Peñaloza (Chepes)
 San Blas de los Sauces (San Blas de los Sauces)
 Sanagasta (Sanagasta)
 Vinchina (Vinchina)

See also

References

External links

Gobierno de La Rioja Official website

 
Wine regions of Argentina
Provinces of Argentina
States and territories established in 1853